Rosalie is a 1937 American musical film directed by W.S. Van Dyke and starring Eleanor Powell, Nelson Eddy and Frank Morgan. An adaptation of the 1928 stage musical of the same name, the film was released in December 1937. The film follows the story of the musical, but replaces most of the Broadway score with new songs by Cole Porter. The story involves the romantic entanglements of a princess in disguise and a West Point cadet.

Plot
Dick Thorpe (Nelson Eddy) is a football star for the Army, and Rosalie (Eleanor Powell), a Vassar student who is also a princess (Princess Rosalie of Romanza) in disguise, watches a football game. They are attracted to each other and agree to meet in her country in Europe. When Dick flies into her country, he is greeted as a hero by the king (Frank Morgan) and finds Rosalie is engaged to marry Prince Paul (Tom Rutherford), who actually is in love with Brenda (Ilona Massey). Dick, not knowing of Prince Paul's affections, leaves the country. The king and his family are forced to leave their troubled country, and Dick and Rosalie are finally reunited at West Point.

Cast
 Nelson Eddy as Dick Thorpe
 Eleanor Powell as Rosalie
 Frank Morgan as King
 Edna May Oliver as Queen
 Ray Bolger as Bill Delroy
 Ilona Massey as Brenda
 Billy Gilbert as Oloff
 Reginald Owen as Chancellor
 Tom Rutherford as Prince Paul
 Clay Clement as Captain Banner
 Virginia Grey as Mary Callahan
 George Zucco as General Maroff
 Oscar O'Shea as Mr. Callahan
 Jerry Colonna as Joseph
 Janet Beecher as Miss Baker
 Tommy Bond as Mickey the Mascot

Production
MGM's top tap dancer at the time, Eleanor Powell, was cast as the princess opposite Nelson Eddy as cadet Dick Thorpe (Lieutenant Richard Fay in the stage musical). Frank Morgan reprised his Broadway role as King Fredrick (King Cyril in the stage version). Also appearing in the film were Ray Bolger (Bill Delroy), Edna May Oliver (the queen), Ilona Massey (Brenda), Tom Rutherford (Prince Paul), and Reginald Owen (Chancellor).  William Anthony McGuire was the producer, with direction by W. S. Van Dyke, cinematography by Oliver Marsh, art direction by Cedric Gibbons, and choreography by Albertina Rasch. Marjorie Lane dubbed the singing voice for Powell. The dance director for the "Cadet routines" was Dave Gould.

To capitalize upon Powell's renown as a dancer, the film was retooled to allow her several showcase musical numbers, one of which is the title number with Powell dancing on top of a giant drum, one of the largest musical sequences ever filmed. Songs included "Who Knows?", "I've a Strange New Rhythm in My Heart", "Rosalie", "In the Still of the Night", and "Spring Love Is in the Air." An excerpt from this scene is included in That's Entertainment! (1974).

The film "resembles the frothy operettas then so much in vogue, which means that Rosalie lacks much of a plot ... he [Porter] managed to compose the memorable 'In the Still of the Night' and 'Who Knows?'."

The reviewer at allmovie.com called the film an "overproduced musical extravaganza", and noted, "The flimsy plot all but collapses under the weight of Gibbons' enormous sets and dance director David Gould's ditto choreography."

Songs
"Who Knows?" - Dick
"I've a Strange New Rhythm in My Heart" - Rosalie
"Rosalie" - Dick
"Why Should I Care?" - King Frederic
"Spring Love is in the Air" - Brenda
"Close" [instrumental]
"In the Still of the Night" - Dick
"It's All Over But the Shouting" - Dick
"To Love or Not to Love" - Dick

References

Green, Stanley (1999) Hollywood Musicals Year by Year (2nd ed.), pub. Hal Leonard Corporation  page 77

External links
 
 
 
 

1937 films
Metro-Goldwyn-Mayer films
American black-and-white films
Films scored by Cole Porter
Films based on musicals
American films based on plays
1937 musical comedy films
1937 romantic comedy films
American musical comedy films
American romantic comedy films
American romantic musical films
Films based on works by P. G. Wodehouse
Films set in Europe
Films set in the United States Military Academy
1930s English-language films
1930s American films